National People's Movement, often abbreviated as NPM (Sinhala: ජාතික ජනතා ව්‍යාපාරය, Tamil: தேசிய மக்கள் இயக்கம்) is a movement established on 18 December 2018 by joining two organisations, Deshodaya and United Professionals Movement with another 17 civil society groups, composed of intellectuals, professionals, teachers, entrepreneurs, young people and village communities

On 29 September 2019, NPM Announced that they will field former commander of Sri Lanka army, General Mahesh Senanayake as their candidate for the 2019 Sri Lankan presidential election

Partners 
National People's movement is a collaboration of following member organizations

 Deshodaya
 United Professionals Movement (UPM)
 Lawyers for Equal Rights
 Sri Lankan Engineers Association
 Trustees (Gte.) Ltd
 Jathika Janatha Commission
 Jathika Parisarika Sanvidana Ekamuthuwa
 Alliance for Political Conscience
 Paramparika Ha Deshiya Waidyawarunge Ekamuthuwa
 Jathika Guru Balaya
 Udara Sri Lanka Organization
 Independent Organization to Protect Depositors
 Mihithala Mithuro Environment Development Foundation
 Janatha Niyojanaye Purogami Sabhawa
 AI Imam Shafi Center for Education & Development
 Dambulu Govijana Vyaparaya

Key members 

 Vinya Ariyaratne
 Gamini Nanda Gunawardana 
Gamini Wijesinghe
 Dr. Ajith Kolonne
 Mahesh Senanayake
Dr. Dayan Rajapakse
Sarath Chandrasiri Mayadunne
Kamal Addararachchi

References 

Political organisations based in Sri Lanka
2018 establishments in Sri Lanka